People Don't Change is a collaborative extended play (EP) by Australian singer-songwriter PJ Harding and American singer Noah Cyrus. The EP was released on April 23, 2021 by Records, LLC and RCA Records, making it her first release on the later label. It was preceded by the singles "Dear August" and "You Belong to Somebody Else". The duo originally met at a songwriting camp in Bali, and eventually teamed up in 2019 to write songs for Cyrus's second EP The End of Everything

 Singles 
The first single from the EP was "Dear August". It was released on February 12, 2021, with its music video. The second single was "You Belong to Somebody Else", released on March 19, 2021 and with a lyric video premiere on April 7, 2021.

Critical reception
Rhian Daly of NME'' called the EP "Understated and gentle" and "a gorgeous leap forward in the youngest Cyrus’ ever-evolving story."

Track listing 
All tracks written and produced by PJ Harding and Noah Cyrus, with additional songwriting from Victoria Zaro on "The Worst of You".

References 

2021 EPs
Noah Cyrus albums
RCA Records EPs